Armen Mikhailovich Stepanyan (born 30 January 1974) is a Russian football manager and a former player.

External links
 

1974 births
Living people
Soviet footballers
Russian footballers
Association football forwards
Russian football managers
FC Ararat Yerevan managers
Russian expatriate football managers
Expatriate football managers in Armenia
FC Mashuk-KMV Pyatigorsk players